Simone Zanoni (born 25 June 1976) is an Italian chef. He is the chef at the George, one of the three restaurants of the Four Seasons Hotel George V, one star at the Michelin guide. He was before a chef at the restaurants of Gordon Ramsay, two and three Michelin stars.

Early life and career 
Simone Zanoni was born in Salò and grew in Lombardy in a farm of Provaglio Val Sabbia, near the lake Garda. He was initiated early into cooking, where his family made its own charcuterie, vegetables and cheeses. During the summer, he visited his grandparents at the mountain, helping his grandfather making cheeses and his grandmother making tortellini. She also learned him a lot technically, especially the cookings.

On the advice of his father, he followed cooking studies at the Istituto Alberghiero polivalente in Idro while working the weekend in a cooking team on the lake Garda. Graduated at the age of 18, he decided to move to London to learn English. He began working in a trattoria called the Mediterraneo, while following classed at Le Cordon Bleu to improve himself.

Career 
Thanks to a job offer, Simone Zanoni started working as a cooking assistant in a restaurant of Gordon Ramsay, the Michelin starred restaurant Aubergine in London, before becoming chef de partie. In January 2001, he became sous-chef in the restaurants of Ramsay, working in the restaurants Amarylis (one Michelin star), Petrus (two Michelin stars) and the Claridge's (one Michelin star). In 2003, Simone Zanoni briefly returned working in Italy at the restaurant Dal Pescatore in Canneto sull'Oglio. In August 2003, after the accidental death of the chef David Dempsey, he became at age 27 the chef of the restaurant Gordon Ramsay in London, the only restaurant having three Michelin stars in the British capital. In 2007, he moved to Versailles where he became the chef of the restaurant Gordon Ramsay at the Trianon Palace (two Michelin stars).

In September 2016, Simone Zanoni became the chef of the George, the Mediterranean restaurtant of the Hotel George V, opened since October 2015, second table of the restaurant after Le Cinq, three starred table of chef Christian Le Squer. The hotel then opened a third table named L'Orangerie with Alain Taudon. In 2017, the George obtained a first Michelin star.

In 2017, Simone Zanoni also created a vegetable garden for the restaurant, at the Domain of Montreuil in the Yvelines on a parcel of 3,000 m2, managed by 5 gardeners, including people in professional reinsertion. Engaged in the preservation of the environment and for a "reasoned" gastronomy, Simone Zanoni  created a bio-virtuous system, the trash of the George is transformed into composting used to nourish the grounds of the vegetable garden. He was also chef of the kasher restaurant Le Rafaël in Paris, opened in 2014 and closed since, and opened a pizzeria in Versailles named Pizzeria César by Simone Zanoni.

Other activities 
Passionated of cars, Simone Zanoni is an ambassador for Porsche.

Publications

References 

1976 births
Living people
Italian chefs